Tokonatsu Endless is FLOW's twenty sixth single. The single has two editions: regular and limited. The limited edition includes a bonus DVD. It reached #35 on the Oricon charts  and charted for 2 weeks. *

Track listing

Bonus DVD Track listing

References

2013 singles
2013 songs
Ki/oon Music singles
Flow (band) songs